Nabagram Hiralal Paul College, also known as Konnagar College, established in 1957, is one of the oldest colleges in Konnagar,  in the Hooghly district, West Bengal, India. It offers undergraduate courses in arts, commerce and sciences.  It is affiliated to  University of Calcutta.

Departments (Under Graduate)

Science
 Chemistry
 Physics
 Mathematics
 Economics

Arts
 Bengali
 Hindi
 English
 Sanskrit
 History
 Geography
 Political science
 Philosophy
 Psychology
 Sociology
 Education

Commerce 
 Accountancy

B.Voc 

 Retail Management
 Hospitality & Tourism

Departments (Post Graduate) 

 Bengali 
 Started in 2017, affiliated to University of Calcutta.

Accreditation 
The college is recognized by the University Grants Commission (UGC). In 2006 it was accredited by the National Assessment and Accreditation Council (NAAC), and awarded B grade, an accreditation that has since then expired. Recently The college was re-accredited with a score of 2.75 (equivalent to B++ presently) in 2016.

See also 
List of colleges affiliated to the University of Calcutta
Education in India
Education in West Bengal

References
Latest News on this College - Professor Of Nabagram Hiralal Paul College Allegedly Attacked By Students in Nabagram Hiralal Paul College.

External links
Nabagram Hiralal Paul College

Universities and colleges in Hooghly district
University of Calcutta affiliates
Educational institutions established in 1957
1957 establishments in West Bengal